Dorcadion martinezii is a species of beetle in the family Cerambycidae. It was described by Perez-Arcas in 1874. It is known from Spain.

See also 
Dorcadion

Varietas
 Dorcadion martinezii var. decemvittatum Lauffer, 1911
 Dorcadion martinezii var. dorsigerum Lauffer, 1911
 Dorcadion martinezii var. intuberculatum Lauffer, 1911
 Dorcadion martinezii var. madridense Breuning, 1947
 Dorcadion martinezii var. varipes Lauffer, 1911

References

martinezii
Beetles described in 1874